Ana Joković (Serbian Cyrillic: Ана Јоковић; born 16 July 1979)  is a former Serbian basketball player who competed for FR Yugoslavia in the 2002 FIBA World Championship for Women.

References

External links
 Profile at eurobasket.com

1979 births
Living people
Basketball players from Belgrade
Serbian expatriate basketball people in Bosnia and Herzegovina
Serbian expatriate basketball people in Hungary
Serbian expatriate basketball people in Israel
Serbian expatriate basketball people in Montenegro
Serbian expatriate basketball people in Poland
Serbian expatriate basketball people in Romania
Serbian women's basketball players
Serbian basketball executives and administrators
Power forwards (basketball)
ŽKK Crvena zvezda players
ŽKK Vojvodina players